Viktor Pavlovych Sakhno (born 1 December 1961) is a former Ukrainian professional footballer.

Club career
He made his professional debut in the Soviet Second League in 1980 for FC Avanhard Rivne.

References

1961 births
Living people
Footballers from Kyiv
Soviet footballers
Association football forwards
Ukrainian footballers
FC Dynamo Kyiv players
NK Veres Rivne players
FC Chornomorets Odesa players
SC Odesa players
CSF Bălți players
FC KAMAZ Naberezhnye Chelny players
FC Podillya Khmelnytskyi players
FC Dnister Ovidiopol players
Soviet Top League players
Moldovan Super Liga players
Russian Premier League players
Ukrainian First League players
Ukrainian expatriate footballers
Expatriate footballers in Moldova
Expatriate footballers in Russia
Expatriate footballers in Germany
Ukrainian expatriate sportspeople in Germany
Ukrainian expatriate sportspeople in Moldova
Ukrainian football managers
FC Palmira Odesa managers
FC Chornomorets-2 Odesa managers
K. D. Ushinsky South Ukrainian National Pedagogical University alumni